Boulenger's tree agama  (Dendragama boulengeri) is a species of lizard in the family Agamidae. The species is endemic to Sumatra.

Etymology
Both the specific name, boulengeri, and the common name, Boulenger's tree agama, are in honor of Belgian-born British herpetologist George Albert Boulenger.

Description
Dorsally, D. boulengeri is bluish green, with blackish crossbars. Ventrally it is pinkish, with brown spots.

Reproduction
D. boulengeri is oviparous.

References

Further reading
Doria G (1888). "Note erpetologiche I. Alcuni nuovi sauri raccolti in Sumatra dal D.re O. Beccari ". Annali del Museo Civico di Storia Naturale di Genova, Serie Seconda [Series 2] 6: 646–652. (Dendragama, new genus, p. 649; D. boulengeri, new species, pp. 649–651). (in Italian).

Dendragama
Reptiles described in 1888
Taxa named by Giacomo Doria